St. Ambrose Church, Saint Ambrose Parish, Sant'Ambrogio, Église Saint-Ambroise, or variations, may refer to:

Australia
St Ambrose Church, Brunswick, Victoria

Canada
Saint-Ambroise Church, Montreal

France
Saint-Ambroise, Paris

Italy
Saint Ambrose, Brugherio, a church in Italy
Sant'Ambrogio, Florence
Basilica of Sant'Ambrogio, Milan

United Kingdom
St Ambrose's Church, Grindleton, Lancashire
St Ambrose's Church, Speke, Liverpool

United States
St. Ambrose Church (Bridgeport, Connecticut)
St. Ambrose Church (Cheverly, Maryland)
St. Ambrose Cathedral (Des Moines, Iowa)
St. Ambrose Church (New York City)
St. Ambrose Church (St. Nazianz, Wisconsin)
St. Ambrose Church (West Hollywood, California)

See also
 St. Ambrose Cathedral (disambiguation)